Mäeküla piimamees (The Dairyman of Mäeküla) is a novel by Estonian author Eduard Vilde. It was first published in 1916. It was translated into English as Milkman of the Manor by Melanie Rauk in 1976.

Most of the information given about Mäeküla manor, the location of "Mäeküla piimamehe", corresponds to the Karjaküla manor of the Keila parish at the time, from which a large part of the prototypes of the characters in the novel come from. Vilde's parents worked in this manner, and Vilde himself visited them several times, staying there longer in 1882-1883, 1886-1887 and 1892-1893. During those times, Vilde had gotten to know the life and situation there in detail.

References 

Estonian novels
1916 novels